The Passenger is an upcoming American horror film directed by Carter Smith and written by Jack Stanley. The film stars Kyle Gallner and Johnny Berchtold. Jason Blum serves as an executive producer through his Blumhouse Television banner.

Plot
Randolph Bradley who is perfectly content fading into the background, but when his coworker Benson snaps and goes on a violent killing spree, he’s forced to face his fears and confront his troubled past in order to find a way to survive.

Cast
 Kyle Gallner as Benson
 Johnny Berchtold as Randolph Bradley 
 Liza Weil as Miss Beard
 Billy Slaughter as Hardy

Production
In March 2022, The Passenger was announced as part of Blumhouse Television and Epix's TV movie deal, with Carter Smith directing with Jack Stanley writing the screenplay, with Kyle Gallner, Johnny Berchtold and Liza Weil starring in the film.

Filming
Principal photography on the film began in April 2022 in New Orleans.

Release
The film is set to be released by MGM+ and Paramount Home Entertainment.

References

External links

Upcoming films
American horror thriller films
Blumhouse Productions films
MGM+ original films
Films shot in New Orleans
Upcoming English-language films